Jeffrey Glen Daniel (born August 24, 1955  ) is an American dancer, singer-songwriter, and choreographer, most notable for being a founding member of the R&B vocal group Shalamar. In Nigeria, he is best known as a former Idol series judge.

Career
Daniel was born in Los Angeles. During his career he has taught, worked and ranked alongside musicians and dancers such as Shabba Doo, Geron Casper Candidate, Derek Cooley Jackson/Jaxson, Popin' Pete and The Electric Boogaloos. Daniel first performed "the backslide", a physically complicated dance technique (originally performed by the dance group "The Lockers"), now known as the "moonwalk", on British television during a performance of Shalamar's "A Night to Remember" on Top of the Pops. The song was a hit in 1982, almost a year before Michael Jackson moonwalked on the Motown 25: Yesterday, Today, Forever television broadcast; he was a big fan of Soul Train – on which Jeffrey Daniel had been a back-up dancer. According to Jackson's sister La Toya, Jackson was a fan of Daniel's dancing and sought him out. He soon met, hired and learned from Daniel. 

Daniel gives great credit to a man that inspired him, the original dance 'Locker' Don Campbell, one of the earliest Soul Train dancers. He also gives thanks to Cleveland Moses Jr. his partner on Soul Train and to Tyrone Proctor who was the premier 'Waack' dancer who taught Jeffrey the style of dance known as 'Waacking'. It was on Soul Train whilst doing a routine dressed in black that Daniel and Geron 'Caszper' Candidate and Derek 'Cooley' Jackson/Jaxson first performed the moonwalk on U.S. television.

Shalamar
Daniel and his Soul Train dance partner Jody Watley,along with Howard Hewett, became the soul funk group Shalamar who had hit such songs as "A Night to Remember", "The Second Time Around", "I Can Make You Feel Good", "Friends", "Make That Move", "Take That to the Bank", "There It Is" and "I Owe You One". During the 1980s, Daniel was often seen on the London club scene with the likes of Bananarama, Wham and Culture Club. 

In 1984, after seven years as a group, Shalamar performed at London's Wembley Arena and went their separate ways. Soon after, Daniel took on the role of 'Electra' in Andrew Lloyd Webber's new West End musical Starlight Express which involved wild costumes with complex choreography on roller skates. Also in 1984 Daniel appeared in the Paul McCartney movie Give My Regards to Broad Street displaying his signature robotic or marionette-like dancing style (with McCartney, his wife Linda McCartney and members of the band Toto made up as marionettes) to the Wings hit, "Silly Love Songs". In 1985, Daniel hosted 620 Soul Train, a British version of Soul Train which he produced with Don Cornelius.

Work with Michael Jackson
By 1987, Daniel was working with Michael Jackson who had always been a fan of Daniel's dance style since watching him on Soul Train in the 1970s. He was hired as co-choreographer on the "Bad" and "Smooth Criminal" videos with primary choreographer Vincent Paterson in which he also starred with his "dance brothers" Geron "Caszper" Candidate and Derek "Cooley" Jackson/Jaxson. Daniel was later employed as a creative and choreography consultant on his world tours and the video Ghosts. Daniel's music and dance expertise was then employed when he became a consultant at the MJJ Productions record label to whom Brownstone, 3T and Men of Vizion were signed. Michael Jackson flew Daniel back to live in the United States from Japan where Daniel had taken up residence since leaving the United Kingdom.

Recent years
Today, Daniel works and lives in Lagos, Abuja, London and Osaka, Japan. He is a fluent speaker and writer of the Japanese language with a fair grasp of Cantonese. He continues to perform, choreograph, produce and compose with some of the biggest names in show business. He has worked with Babyface, LL Cool J, Paul McCartney, Sheena Easton, The Go-Go's and Vanessa Williams. He joined Nigerian Idol as a judge in 2010 for three seasons and has been performing live shows with a reformed Shalamar since 2002. The Shalamar lineup is Daniel, Howard Hewett and Carolyn Griffey. They continue performing as a group and were touring in 2017 across the UK.

Personal life
Former Shalamar band-mate and dance partner Jody Watley stated in 2010 that she and Daniel had had a tumultuous relationship that included emotional and physical abuse.

On June 13, 1980, Daniel married American R&B singer Stephanie Mills, but they divorced later in 1983.

Discography

Albums
Skinny Boy (1990)
Singles
"AC/DC" (1984) UK #78
"She's the Girl" (1990)
"Make Love Great Again" (2020)

References

External links
Official Website

Archive of Jeffrey Daniel and Shalamar Videos

Moonwalk article

1955 births
1957 births
African-American male singer-songwriters
American dance musicians
American choreographers
Place of birth missing (living people)
Musicians from Los Angeles
Living people
Shalamar members
20th-century African-American male singers
Singer-songwriters from California
American expatriates in Japan